Shastina is a satellite cone of Mount Shasta. It is the second youngest of four overlapping volcanic cones which together form the most voluminous stratovolcano in the Cascade Range. At , Shastina is taller than Mount Adams and would rank as the third highest volcano in the Cascades behind Mount Rainier and Shasta were it not nestled on the western flank of its higher neighbor. The name "Shastina" is a diminutive of Shasta.

Shastina was formed during a VEI-4 eruption around 7650 BC that also involved activity at the summit of Mount Shasta and the Red Banks on Shasta's south flank.

Geological features
Shastina has the general form of a smooth-sided cone truncated by a one half-mile (0.8 km) diameter summit crater, but with several geological features which make it unique among other volcanoes in the Cascade Volcanic Arc. The most prominent feature when seen from lowland viewpoints is Diller Canyon, a large cleft carved into the western flank by pyroclastic flows and since expanded by erosion. It extends from the crater rim near   down for over 7,000 vertical feet (2,100 m) towards the town of Weed in the valley below, and is by far the largest such feature found on any of the Cascade volcanoes. Unseen except by mountaineers and fliers are the three small crater lakes nestled among the cones and ridges of the summit crater, which rarely melt free of snow until late summer. These lakes are the highest subaerial lakes in the entire Cascade Range, exceeded only by the subglacial lake beneath the ice of Mount Rainier's summit crater.

Climbing and skiing 
Shastina is most commonly and easily climbed via the Cascade Gulch route, which ascends from Hidden Valley diagonally up to the Shasta-Shastina saddle, and then continuing up the eastern flank of Shastina's cone to its summit.  For most mountaineers, it represents only a quick side trip on the downclimb after summiting Shasta.  But for ski mountaineers, Shastina presents a reasonable climb in its own right in return for several exceptional ski descents, including Diller Canyon, the North Face, and the South Face.

References

 
 
 
 

Mount Shasta
Cascade Range
Cascade Volcanoes
Subduction volcanoes
Stratovolcanoes of the United States
Lakes of Siskiyou County, California
Volcanic crater lakes
Volcanoes of Siskiyou County, California
Parasitic cones
Lakes of California
Volcanoes of California
Cinder cones of the United States
Lakes of Northern California
Holocene stratovolcanoes